Hofa Park is an unincorporated community located in the town of Maple Grove, Shawano County, Wisconsin, United States. The community was named for John J. Hof, an owner of a land company in the 1880s.

References

Unincorporated communities in Shawano County, Wisconsin
Unincorporated communities in Wisconsin